Mdoukha  is a village and municipality  east of Beirut in the Rashaya District, Beqaa Governorate, Lebanon. A significant majority of the population is considered to be Lebanese Canadian, with 60% living in London, Ontario. Most of the population identifies as Sunni Muslim.

Mdoukha lies at the foothills of Mount Hermon (which can be seen from many different points in and around the town) in the Rashaya District of the Beqaa Valley, about 15 kilometres northwest of Mount Hermon, and 72 kilometres east of Beirut. It sits 1102 metres above sea level. Villages surrounding Mdoukha include Ain Arab, Al-Bireh, Al-Rafid, Bakka, Kfardenis, and Kherbet Rouha.

With a blend of modern architecture and homes that date back a century, Mdoukha has not lost its image as a historical Lebanese town full of culture and tradition. Mdoukha has historically been a farming town, with beautiful green spaces and small farms throughout the town, and many fields and larger farms surrounding the area.

It also has some natural and historic attractions, including a small park just outside the town, where the locals as well as the residents of neighbouring towns enjoy the beautiful Mediterranean scenery and weather during the spring and summer. On one of the nearby mountains, there are ruins of what appears to have been a castle that is said to date back thousands of years by the locals, although no official research or studies exist to confirm this.

No official census data is available, as is the case for the rest of the country, however locals and expatriates estimate Mdoukha's population to be approximately 3300 people, of which the majority lives in London, Ontario.

References

External links
video of Mdoukha on YouTube
 https://www.youtube.com/watch?v=ks5BhvtNRoA&t=1s
https://www.youtube.com/watch?v=i2P6xBW2yb0

Populated places in Rashaya District
Sunni Muslim communities in Lebanon
Archaeological sites in Lebanon
Roman sites in Lebanon
Tourist attractions in Lebanon